Nancy Apple is a Memphis, Tennessee musician, songwriter, producer, radio personality, former NARAS executive, and owner of the independent record label Ringo Records. Known professionally as the "Cadillac Cowgirl", Apple has been active in promoting the music and culture of Memphis since the early 1980s. She has collaborated in songwriting with Keith Sykes and other professionals in Memphis, Nashville, Tennessee, and Austin, Texas. Her first album, Outside the Lines was released in 2001.

References 

Year of birth missing (living people)
Living people